A. lutea may refer to:

 Acanthodoris lutea, a sea slug
 Acronicta lutea, a dagger moth
 Actinactia lutea, a tachinid fly
 Admetula lutea, a nutmeg snail
 Alcithoe lutea, a sea snail
 Aletris lutea, a medicinal plant
 Alphonsea lutea, a custard apple
 Anacolosa lutea, a woody plant
 Andrena lutea, a mining bee
 Anistylis lutea, a plant with yellow flowers
 Appendicula lutea, a tropical epiphyte
 Architectonica lutea, a staircase shell
 Arenitalea lutea, a marine bacterium from the genus of Arenitalea
 Argyrotheca lutea, a small lampshell
 Armillaria lutea, a honey mushroom
 Arugisa lutea, an owlet moth
 Asclepias lutea, a milkweed native to eastern North America
 Asphodeline lutea, a perennial plant
 Asplundia lutea, a plant endemic to Ecuador
 Assiminea lutea, a salt marsh snail
 Asteranthe lutea, a custard apple
 Asterina lutea, a sea star
 Asura lutea, a New Guinean moth
 Autochloris lutea, an owlet moth